B. Shankaranand (1925-2009) was a congress leader from Karnataka and minister in government of India.

He held the following portfolios in the Union Cabinet:

He worked as a cabinet minister under the Prime Ministership of Smt. Indira Gandhi, Shri Rajiv Gandhi and Shri P.V. Narasimha Rao.
 
He headed the first ever Joint Parliamentary Committee (JPC) formed to investigate into the Bofors deal which gave its report on 26 April 1988.

He has represented Chikkodi (Lok Sabha constituency) for 29 years from 1967 to 1996, winning 7 times consecutively from the same place in his political career, creating a record of sorts.

References 

1925 births
2009 deaths
Indian National Congress politicians from Karnataka
People from Belagavi district
India MPs 1971–1977
India MPs 1977–1979
India MPs 1980–1984
India MPs 1984–1989
India MPs 1989–1991
India MPs 1991–1996
India MPs 1967–1970
Lok Sabha members from Karnataka
Education Ministers of India
Ministers of Power of India
Petroleum and Natural Gas Ministers of India
Law Ministers of India
Health ministers of India
Members of the Cabinet of India